Ascwulf (or Æscwulf) was a medieval Bishop of Dunwich. He was bishop in the 8th century, but it is not known exactly when he was consecrated or his date of death.

References

External links

Bishops of Dunwich (ancient)
Date of death unknown
Year of birth unknown
Year of death unknown